Dwayne Arlan Alons (October 30, 1946 – November 29, 2014) was an American politician.  A Republican, he sat in the Iowa House of Representatives from 1999 to 2014, representing the 5th district until 2003, and the 4th district thereafter. He was a brigadier general in the Iowa Air National Guard and served as chief of staff at its headquarters. Alons died of cancer on November 29, 2014. He was succeeded in office by John Kooiker.

Education
Dwayne Alons was one of four siblings born to Gerrit Alons and Hattie Alons, née Tensen. Alons graduated from Boyden–Hull High School in 1964. He earned a B.S. degree in mathematics from Northwestern College in Orange City, Iowa, in 1968, his M.S. degree in management from the University of Arkansas in Fayetteville, Arkansas, in 1974, graduated from the Air Command and Staff College correspondence program in 1984, completed the National Security Management Course in 1987, and graduated from the Army War College 1990.

Military service
Alons was the chief of staff at the Iowa Air National Guard Headquarters.  He was responsible for ensuring that units of the Iowa Air National Guard are organized, manned, equipped, trained, and ready to accomplish their assigned state and federal missions.  He served as principal advisor to the Assistant Adjutant General on matters pertaining to Guard.  Alons' military career began in 1969, when he received a commission through Officer Training School. He served as a command pilot, with more than 3,860 flying hours in the F-4, F-100, A-7, and F-16.

Legislative career
, Alons served on several committees in the Iowa House – the Agriculture, Economic Growth, and Judiciary Committees.  He also served as the chair of the Veterans Affairs committee and as a member of the Transportation, Infrastructure, and Capitals Appropriations Subcommittee.

Alons died in office on November 29, 2014, of cancer.

Electoral history
*incumbent

References

External links

 Representative Dwayne Alons official Iowa General Assembly site
 
 Financial information (state office) at the National Institute for Money in State Politics
 Profile at Iowa House Republicans
 

Republican Party members of the Iowa House of Representatives
1946 births
2014 deaths
Northwestern College (Iowa) alumni
University of Arkansas alumni
United States Air Force generals
People from Hull, Iowa
Deaths from cancer in Iowa
Deaths from kidney cancer
Iowa National Guard personnel